Madapati Hanumantha Rao (22 January 1885 – 11 November 1970) was an Indian statesman, poet and a short-story writer. He was the first Mayor of Hyderabad from 1951 to 1954. He is also a Padma Bhushan recipient.

Revival of the Telugu Language in Nizam's Dominion 
He helped to found the Andhra Mahasabha. He came to be called the Andhra Pitamaha.

Public worker 
He was a member of the Senate and Syndicate of Osmania University.

He held political meetings outside the limits of the Hyderabad state. The first Hyderabad political conference was held in Kakinada in 1923, due to the initiative taken by M. Hanumantha Rao.

References 

Telugu people
1885 births
1970 deaths
Recipients of the Padma Bhushan in social work
Poets from Karnataka
20th-century Indian poets
People from Krishna district
Mayors of Hyderabad, India
Karnataka politicians
20th-century Indian politicians
Andhra movement